is a Japanese manga series written and illustrated by Hiromasa Okushima. It was serialized between 2012 and 2014 in Shōnen Gahōsha's Young King magazine. It was adapted into a live action film that was released in the fall of 2014 in Japan.

Plot 
Akira, the main character, is trying his best to become the strongest in his high school, not in terms of intelligence but through fighting since this high school revolves around fighting for the top spot instead of education. Even teachers can't resist the fighting and are nearly forced to overlook the violence. Akira wants to dethrone the current No.1 Tsutomu but to get there he has to take on a few more challengers since most of them want to take the spot for themselves.

Characters
Akira (Ryota Ozawa)
Tsutomu (Yasuhiro Kidō)

Release

References

External links

Japanese action films
Japanese martial arts films
Live-action films based on manga
Manga adapted into films
Seinen manga
Shōnen Gahōsha manga
2010s Japanese films
2010s Japanese-language films